Shiv Pratap Shukla (born 1 April 1952) is an Indian politician. Currently, he is the Governor of Himachal Pradesh. He was the Minister of State for Finance in the First Modi ministry. He is Member of Parliament in the upper house (Rajya Sabha) of the Indian Parliament. He represents the state of Uttar Pradesh.

Political career

ABVP to Bharatiya Janata Party
Shukla campaigned in the General Elections in 1989 and was elected a member of the Uttar Pradesh Legislative Assembly, defeating Shri Sunil Shastri of INC. He was elected as Member of the Legislative Assembly four consecutive times in 1989, 1991, 1993 and 1996.

Minister of state in the BJP government
Shukla was appointed a state minister in Bharatiya Janata Party (BJP) led governments in Uttar Pradesh. He was appointed the cabinet Minister for Jails in 1996–1998 under Bharatiya Janata Party–Bahujan Samaj Party a short-lived coalition government of Mayawati & Kalyan Singh & later on appointed Minister for Rural Development  in year 1998–2002 under BJP government of Rajnath Singh.

References

|-

External links
Official Site of Legislature in Uttar Pradesh

Living people
1952 births
Narendra Modi ministry
People from Gorakhpur
Bharatiya Janata Party politicians from Uttar Pradesh
State cabinet ministers of Uttar Pradesh
Deen Dayal Upadhyay Gorakhpur University alumni
Uttar Pradesh MLAs 1989–1991
Uttar Pradesh MLAs 1991–1993
Uttar Pradesh MLAs 1993–1996
Indians imprisoned during the Emergency (India)
Rajya Sabha members from Uttar Pradesh
Uttar Pradesh MLAs 1997–2002